The Clásico Internacional del Caribe or Caribbean Derby is the thoroughbred most important black-type stakes race in the Caribbean for three-year-old thoroughbred horses, held on the month of December. The race features the best 3-year-old colts and fillies from the countries which are members of the Confederacion Hipica del Caribe.

Along with the celebration of the Clásico Internacional del Caribe, four other international races are programmed during the weekend festivities. These races are the Copa Velocidad (Caribbean Sprint Cup) (6f), Copa Dama del Caribe (Caribbean Ladies' Classic) (8.5f), Copa Invitacional del Caribe (10f), and the Confraternity Cup (10f) for 3 & up horses.

The 2017 edition of the Clásico Internacional del Caribe was held at Gulfstream Park in Hallandale, Florida. Gulfstream was the first pari-mutuel track outside of Latin American and the Caribbean to host the event. Bringing for the first time World class substance abuse rules to the most important Race of the Caribbean and a LEVELED field of competition for ALL the countries which are members of the Confederacion Hipica del CAribe.

History
The Clásico Internacional del Caribe occurred after thirteen years of arduous work. Engineer Ramón Llobet Jr and Lic. Abelardo Ruiz Suria, among other distinguished Puerto Rican horsemen, created the event in 1966. This derby was designed in order to strengthen ties of friendship and brotherhood between the countries of the Caribbean. To be eligible to run in the Clásico a thoroughbred must be bred in one of the confederation member nations.

Panamá is the country with most winning in this black-type stakes with 15 followed by Venezuela with 14, Mexico with 11 and Puerto Rico with 8. Colombia and Dominican Republic has won the stakes only once.
The Venezuelan jockey Emisael Jaramillo has more victories in this stake with 5 followed by Panamanian Cornelio Velásquez with 3.

Four jockeys have won both the Kentucky Derby and the Clasico Internacional del Caribe:
Gustavo Ávila (Canonero II and Victoreado (VEN))
Jacinto Vásquez (Genuine Risk,  and Barremina (PAN))
Laffit Pincay Jr. (Swale and Pikotazo (MEX))
Joel Rosario (Orb and Sicotico (DOM))
Gustavo Ávila is the only jockey to win the Preakness Stakes and the Caribbean Derby (Canonero II and Victoreado (VEN)).

Five jockeys have won the Belmont Stakes and the Caribbean Derby:
Ruben Hernandez (Coastal and Ezgarta (MEX))
Laffit Pincay Jr. (Conquistador Cielo, Swale, Caveat and Pikotazo (MEX))
Fernando Jara (Jazil and Ay Papá (PAN))
Joel Rosario (Tonalist and Sicotico (DOM))
Irad Ortiz Jr. (Creator and Jala Jala (MEX))
Venezuela is the only country to win on four consecutive occasions (with Bambera in 2009, Water Jet in 2010, Heisenberg in 2011 and El de Chine in 2012). On eleven occasions a country has managed to finish in the top two positions: Mexico with Guadamur and Gumiel (1969), Voy por Uno and Barrullero (1976) and Ezgarta and Gran Zar (1978); Venezuela with Rayo Laser and Gallardete (1987), Alighieri and Jib Dancer (1997), Water Jet and Gran Charlie (2010); Panama with Cortisol and Gotti (1999), and El Tigre Mono and Chantik (2016); and Puerto Rico with Vuelve Candy B. and Satin Charger (1991), Borrascoso and Shahid (2005), Soy Conquistador and Primero Nieto (2007). In 2009, for the first time officially two fillies occupied the top two positions: Bambera (VEN) and Vivian Record (MEX). In 1996 two fillies, Angelical (PAN) and La Supernova (PR), occupied the top two positions but the latter was disqualified to the 3rd position.

On one occasion a brother-sister team sired by the same horse were the first and second-place finishers: El Tigre Mono and Chantik finished 1–2 in 2016.  Both were sired by Concerto.

The longest gap between winners of one country is of 14 years (Puerto Rico – Wiso G, 1968 to Guaybanex, 1982 and Soy Conquistador, 2007 to Tamborero, 2021).

Pikotazo (MEX) is the only winner of the Clásico del Caribe to run in the US Triple Crown Race (in the 1980 Belmont Stakes, finishing 10th).

Verset Dancer (PR) was the first filly to win the Clásico del Caribe, also establishing a track (the then Hipodromo El Comandante) and stake record (1:50:1/5). Six more fillies beside Verset Dancer have won the Clásico del Caribe: Galilea (COL) in 1984; Angelical (PAN) in 1996; Alexia (PAN) in 2001; Bambera (VEN) in 2009; Ninfa del Cielo (VEN) in 2014; and Jala Jala (MEX) in 2017.

Verset Jet (PR), winner in 1993 is a product out of Verset Dancer (PR), winner in 1983.

Rosemary Homeister Jr. is the first (and so far only) female jockey to win the Clasico del Caribe.

Five Clasico del Caribe winners went to win the Copa Confraternidad (Confraternity Cup): Verset Jet (PR) in 1994; My Own Business (VEN) in 2002 and 2003; Soy Conquistador (PR) in 2009; El Tigre Mono (PAN) in 2017; and Kukulkan (MEX) in 2019.

Winners of the Clásico Internacional del Caribe

A † designates a Triple Crown Winner in their native country.
A ‡ designates a filly.
 Notes:

Winners by country

References

External links
seriehipicadelcaribe.com

Racing series for horses
Sports competitions in Puerto Rico
Horse races
Flat horse races for three-year-olds